Sorin Iulian Pîtea (born 9 July 1997) is a Romanian ski jumper who competed in the 2013–14 FIS Ski Jumping World Cup. He competed for Romania at the 2014 Winter Olympics in Men's normal hill individual. He came second in the reality survival show Supraviețuitorul: Filipine.

References 

1997 births
Living people
Ski jumpers at the 2014 Winter Olympics
Olympic ski jumpers of Romania
Romanian male ski jumpers
Sportspeople from Brașov